North End is a mainly residential neighbourhood in the middle of Portsea Island in Portsmouth, England.  It developed rapidly after a horse-drawn tram route was opened between Portsmouth and Cosham. The area is composed of mainly late Victorian to early 20th-century buildings. It is bounded to the west by Stamshaw, to the south by Buckland and Kingston, to the east by Copnor and by Hilsea to the north.

Name
North End's name is derived from its origin as a northern expansion of the (then) village of Kingston, forming the "northern end" of Kingston.

Shopping, leisure and recreation 
 North End continues to support a wide range of small traders, supermarkets and other retailers, as well as a variety of pubs and budget fast food outlets.
 The Odeon cinema, opened in the 1930s and built in the Art Deco style, was a prominent local landmark until its closure in January 2008. The building was designed by Andrew Mather. The auditorium buildings have remained intact, although in extremely poor condition. The foyer of the building was then used as an OJ's Discount Store in December 2008, and later a Sainsbury's Local in December 2012 until its closure in 2020. A Polish Supermarket now accompanies the space.
 A public library operates near the junction of North End with Gladys Avenue.

Churches
There are two main Anglican churches in the area:
St Mark, Portsea, which is sited in Derby Road just off the main London Road shopping centre.  The church stood from 1874 to 1970 on the corner of London Road with Derby Road, before being rebuilt in the late 1960s at its present site in Derby Road opposite the former site.
The Church of the Ascension in Stubbington Avenue, which was carved out of the old St Mark's Parish.  The worship at this church is high Anglican.

There is also a Roman Catholic church on Gladys Avenue, Corpus Christi.

References

Areas of Portsmouth